Uqchi may refer to:
 Uqchi Bozorg
 Uqchi Kuchek